Álvaro Iglesias may refer to:

 Álvaro Iglesias (footballer) (born 1972), Spanish footballer
 Álvaro Iglesias (field hockey) (born 1993), Spanish field hockey player